Margarete Müller (born 18 February 1931) is a German retired politician who was a member of the State Council of East Germany and, between 1963 and 1989, of the Central Committee of the Socialist Unity Party of Germany (SED). She was a candidate member of the SED politburo until the end of the one-party system.

Life 

Müller was born in Neustadt, Upper Silesia, into a working-class family. She was forced to move to Mecklenburg after the Second World War, and became a tractor driver. In 1951 Müller joined the SED. She studied agricultural science in Demmin and at the University of Leningrad until 1958. She then worked at an LPG collective farm near Galenbeck.

In January 1963 Müller joined the Central Committee (ZK) of the SED and a candidate (non-voting member) of the politburo. Then, in 1971, she was appointed to the State Council, East Germany's collective head of state. She held responsibility for agriculture, forestry and food production.

She was expelled from the SED-PDS.

Awards 

Müller received several significant awards and honours:

 Patriotic Order of Merit in Silver (1964)
 Banner of Labor (1969)
 Order of Karl Marx (1974)
 Patriotic Order of Merit in Gold (1981)
 Clara Zetkin Medal
 
  in Gold

References 

1931 births
Living people
People from Prudnik
People from the Province of Upper Silesia
Candidate members of the Politburo of the Central Committee of the Socialist Unity Party of Germany
Members of the State Council of East Germany
Members of the 4th Volkskammer
Members of the 5th Volkskammer
Members of the 6th Volkskammer
Members of the 7th Volkskammer
Members of the 8th Volkskammer
Members of the 9th Volkskammer
Female members of the Volkskammer
Recipients of the Patriotic Order of Merit in silver
Recipients of the Patriotic Order of Merit in gold
Recipients of the Banner of Labor
Recipients of the Medal of Merit of the GDR